Randy John Johnston (born June 2, 1958) is a Canadian former professional ice hockey player who played four games in the National Hockey League for the New York Islanders during the 1979–80 season.

Playing career
Johnston was born in Brampton, Ontario. He played junior hockey for the Peterborough Petes from 1975 to 1978. The Islanders chose him in the second round of the 1978 NHL Amateur Draft. He joined the Fort Worth Texans for the 1978–79 season. In the 1979–80 season Johnston moved to the Indianapolis Checkers. That season, Johnston joined the Islanders for four games. It was his only NHL experience and he remained in the Islanders' system until he retired in 1983.

Career statistics

Regular season and playoffs

References

External links
 

1958 births
Living people
Canadian ice hockey defencemen
Fort Worth Texans players
Ice hockey people from Ontario
Indianapolis Checkers (CHL) players
New York Islanders draft picks
New York Islanders players
Peterborough Petes (ice hockey) players
Sportspeople from Brampton